Moisey may refer to:

Moisey Feigin (1904–2008), Russian artist of Jewish extraction
Moisey Markov (1908–1994), Soviet physicist-theorist in quantum mechanics, nuclear physics and particle physics
Moisey Ostrogorsky (1854–1921), Belarusian political scientist, historian, jurist and sociologist